Stephen Joseph Milosz (26 December 1955 – 20 July 2022) was an Australian cricketer, who played first-class cricket for Western Australia from 1983–84 to 1985–86, and then for Tasmania in 1986–87, before returning to Western Australia for his final first-class season in 1987–88. He was a right-arm leg-spin bowler.

References

External links
 

1955 births
2022 deaths
Australian cricketers
Tasmania cricketers
Western Australia cricketers
Australian people of Polish descent
People from Northam, Western Australia
Cricketers from Western Australia